The 2005 Barbarians rugby union tour  was a series of matches played in May 2005 in by Barbarians F.C.

Results 
In the first match, Scotland won easily despite missing the players involved in the Lions tour to New Zealand.

Scotland: Chris Paterson; Rory Lamont, Mark Di Rollo, A. Henderson, Sean Lamont; G. Ross, Mike Blair; Allan Jacobsen, S. Lawson, B. Douglas, S. Grimes, S. Murray, K. Brown, A. Hogg, J. Petrie (c) – Replacements: D. Hall, E. Murray, C. Hamilton, A. Wilson, G. Beveridge, Dan Parks, Hugo Southwell.

Barbarians: G.Dempsey (Ireland); Brian Lima (Samoa), Matt Burke (Australia), Kevin Maggs (Ireland), Sereli Bobo (Fiji); David Humphreys (c; Ireland), Bryan Redpath; Andrea Lo Cicero, F. Sheahan (Ireland), D. Morris (Wales), Gary Longwell (Ireland), AJ Venter (South Africa), O. Finegan (Australia), Semo Sititi (Samoa), E. Miller (Ireland) -Replacements: Raphaël Ibañez (France), C. Visagie (South Africa), S. Boome (South Africa), J. O'Connor (Ireland), M. Robinson (New Zealand), Thomas Castaignède (France), Kenny Logan (Scotland).

Against Ireland (also without the better players involved in the Lions tour, Barbarians obtain an easy win)

Notes and references 

2005
2005
2004–05 in Scottish rugby union
2004–05 in English rugby union